Amelie Kleinmanns (born 30 August 1988) is a German sport shooter.

She participated at the 2018 ISSF World Shooting Championships, winning a medal.

References

External links
 
 

1988 births
Living people
German female sport shooters
ISSF rifle shooters
People from Viersen (district)
Sportspeople from Düsseldorf (region)
European Games competitors for Germany
Shooters at the 2015 European Games
21st-century German women